Huddersfield Town's 1971–72 campaign was Town's last season in the Football League's top division. They finished bottom of the table with only 25 points, the same as Nottingham Forest. Town won only 6 matches in the league all season and did not win any games from December to the end of the season. The only bright spark came in the FA Cup campaign which saw Town reach the 6th round, before losing to Birmingham City. Town only scored 6 away goals in 1972, and 2 of those were own goals. This would be the start of Town's slump which would see Town relegated to Division 4 in 1975, and they would not return to the top flight, by then the Premier League, until 2017.

Squad at the start of the season

Review
Following their first season back in Division 1 for 15 years, Town were hoping to try to reach the summit of English football. This season would be one of Town's worst in their history. Town were bottom of the table all season, with the exception of a small period in September. They had a run of 4 wins in 5 during that time including a 2–1 win over rivals Leeds United. Town's last league win on 27 November was a 2–1 win over Derby County, who would become champions at the end of the season.

Town never won another league game until the next season, but they put on an inspired run in the FA Cup. After beating Division 2 sides Burnley and Fulham, Town hosted West Ham United and put on a thrilling display culminating in a 4–2 win over the Hammers. They then lost to Birmingham City in the 6th round and were then promptly relegated to Division 2 with 25 points, the same as Nottingham Forest.

Squad at the end of the season

Results

Division One

FA Cup

Football League Cup

Appearances and goals

1971-72
English football clubs 1971–72 season